The list of ship launches in 1770 includes a chronological list of some ships launched in 1770.


References

1770
Ship launches